Lucas Pouille defeated Feliciano López in the final, 4–6, 7–6(7–5), 6–4 to win the singles tennis title at the 2017 Stuttgart Open. Pouille saved a match point en route to the title, in the second round against Jan-Lennard Struff.

Dominic Thiem was the reigning champion, but chose not to participate this year.

Seeds
The top four seeds receive a bye into the second round.

Draw

Finals

Top half

Bottom half

Qualifying

Seeds

Qualifiers

Qualifying draw

First qualifier

Second qualifier

Third qualifier

Fourth qualifier

References

External links
 Main draw
 Qualifying draw

2017 ATP World Tour
2017 Singles